Midhurst (LSWR) railway station was opened on 1 September 1864 by the London and South Western Railway, the terminus of the line from Petersfield, serving the Market town of Midhurst in West Sussex. The station was closed on 13 July 1925, after the LSWR amalgamated with other railways to create the Southern Railway and services transferred to the former London Brighton and South Coast Railway station. The goods yard remained, however, for some time afterwards, surviving the closure of the LSWR line in 1955.

The station building has survived, unlike the LB&SCR station, and is now in use as offices.

References 

 

Disused railway stations in West Sussex
Railway stations in Great Britain opened in 1864
Railway stations in Great Britain closed in 1925
Former London and South Western Railway stations
Midhurst